Vastedda is the traditional Sicilian bread used to prepare the Pani câ meusa, a sandwich of veal spleen. It often also includes toppings of caciocavallo and ricotta cheese. It is most common in the city of Palermo.

In Gratteri, near Palermo, a fried version called Vastedda fritta is also made. The vastedda fritta is recognized by Italian Ministry of Agricultural, Food and Forestry as a traditional product and is listed into the official list of traditional Italian agricultural and food product.

Sicilian cheese

The term Vastedda or Vastella in Sicilian indicates also different traditional kinds of cheese like Vastedda della Valle del Belice and Vastedda palermitana both recognized by Italian Ministry of Agricultural, Food and Forestry as a traditional product and listed into the official list of traditional Italian agricultural and food products.

See also
 Palermo
 Pani ca meusa

References

Cuisine of Sicily
Italian breads
Italian cheeses
Street food in Italy